Events in the year 2023 in Montenegro.

Incumbents 

 President: Milo Đukanović
 Prime Minister: Dritan Abazović

Events 
Ongoing — COVID-19 pandemic in Montenegro

 19 March – 2023 Montenegrin presidential election

Sports 

 23 July 2022 – May 2023:  2022–23 Montenegrin First League
 2022–23 Montenegrin Cup

 UEFA Euro 2024 qualifying Group G
 2022–23 BIBL season

References 

 
2020s in Montenegro
Years of the 21st century in Montenegro
Montenegro
Montenegro